D. K. Murali is the member of 14th Kerala Legislative Assembly. He represents Vamanapuram constituency and belongs to Communist Party of India (Marxist). His entry to politics was through Students Federation of India (SFI). He became one of the prominent leaders of CPI(M) in Thiruvananthapuram district. He is the district committee member and state council member of All India Lawyers Union.

References

Living people
Kerala MLAs 2016–2021
Politicians from Thiruvananthapuram
Communist Party of India (Marxist) politicians from Kerala
1961 births